Łąka  is a village in the administrative district of Gmina Stepnica, within Goleniów County, West Pomeranian Voivodeship, in north western Poland. It is situated on the edge of the Goleniowska Plain and the Lower Oder Valley.

The village has a population of 319.

References

Villages in Goleniów County